Maspardin is a protein that in humans is encoded by the SPG21 gene.

The protein encoded by this gene was identified by a two-hybrid screen using CD4 as the bait. It binds to the hydrophobic C-terminal amino acids of CD4 which are involved in repression of T cell activation. The interaction with CD4 is mediated by the noncatalytic alpha/beta hydrolase fold domain of this protein. It is thus proposed that this gene product modulates the stimulatory activity of CD4.

Interactions
SPG21 has been shown to interact with CD4.

References

Further reading